Slate's Culture Gabfest is a New York-based podcast from Slate hosted by Stephen Metcalf, Dana Stevens and Julia Turner. The show has been positively reviewed in The Guardian, The Daily Telegraph, The A.V. Club, and Kill Your Darlings, which described the show as the "distilled... pleasures, the prowess and, indeed, the rigours of sophisticated cultural critique". 

From 2012 until 2014, the show was also broadcast on the radio in an abridged version alongside the Slate Political Gabfest as part of WNYC's now discontinued Gabfest Radio.

References

External links

2008 podcast debuts
Audio podcasts
Arts podcasts
Book podcasts